Asten is a municipality and a town in the southern Netherlands.

It is home to the Royal Eijsbouts bell foundry and also a carillon museum.

The spoken language is Peellands, an East Brabantian dialect.

Population centres 
 Asten
 Heusden
 Ommel

History 
Asten has a rich history going back to the Roman period. In the swamp of the village's national park 'De Peel' an ancient Roman centurion helmet was found. Silhouets of Hunter-Gatherer and Agricultural societies were also found in the area.
The village has a castle dating back to the 12th century, at the south of the current village. It has also given its name to the village: "Aa-Stein", or "stone building on the river Aa". A second stone-built fortified building was suspected at the north, at the site of the current Slotweg ("castle road") to be precise. Some stone fragments have been excavated, although no conclusive evidence of a fortified building has been produced here. The village was pillaged and burnt twice in the 17th century, by Austrian and Swedish army troops.

Topography 

Topographic map of Asten (municipality), June 2015]]

Notable residents 
 Driekske van Bussel (1868 in Asten – 1951) an archer, gold medallist at the 1920 Summer Olympics
 Piet Raijmakers (born 1956 in Asten) a Dutch equestrian, gold medallist at the 1992 Summer Olympics
 Jan Verschuren (born 1962 in Asten) a Dutch organist
 Martin Koolhoven (born 1969) a Dutch film director and screenwriter 
 Nancy Coolen (born 1973 in Asten) known as Nance, is a Dutch TV host and former singer for Twenty 4 Seven
 Bart Claessen (born 1980 in Asten) a Dutch Trance music DJ

Gallery

References

External links

Official website
Website National Carillon-museum

 
Municipalities of North Brabant
Populated places in North Brabant